Definitely Now (in some cases stylised as Definitely NOW) is the debut full-length album by English singer-songwriter Liam Bailey. The album was released on 19 August 2014 by record label Sony Masterworks and Flying Buddha, and received multiple re-issues in the years following the album's release. Two singles were released from the album - the lead single "On My Mind", and a version of the originally solo track "Villain" featuring American rapper ASAP Ferg. Definitely Now was executive produced by Bailey and American record producer Salaam Remi, and includes production collaborations with musicians such as Jimmy Hogarth, Zane Lowe, and Dan Smith of the band Bastille.

Track listing

References

External links
 

2014 albums
Sony Music albums
Albums produced by Salaam Remi
Albums produced by Fraser T. Smith